Münch or Muench is a German surname, meaning "monk". Notable people with this surname include the following:

 Edvard Munch (1863–1944), Norwegian Expressionist Painter, best known for "The Scream"
 Aloisius Joseph Muench (1889–1962), German-American cardinal, Papal Nuncio to Germany 1951–1959
 Burkhard VII. Münch (died 1444), Swiss knight
 Charles Munch (conductor), born Münch (1891–1968), Alsatian conductor
 Baron Eligius Franz Joseph von Münch-Bellinghausen (1806–1871), Austrian playwright better known by his pen name, Friedrich Halm
 Ernst Münch (musician) (1859–1928), Alsatian organist
 Ernst Münch (1876–1946), German plant physiologist
 Friedrich Münch (1799–1881), German-American Rationalist, winemaker, Missouri State Senator and prolific author for German emigrants
 Guido Münch (born 1921), Mexican astronomer
 Hans Münch (1911–2001), SS doctor acquitted in the Auschwitz trials
 Hartung Münch (c. 1265–1332), Bishop of Basel from 1325 to 1328
 Julitta Münch (1959-2020), German journalist
 Richard Münch (1916–1987), German actor
 Dr. Werner Münch (born 1940), German politician of the CDU party
 Münch (family lineage), noble family originating in Basel, Switzerland, including the branches Münch von Münchenstein, Münch von Münchsberg and Münch von Landskro

See also
 Münch (motorcycles) a small German motorbike factory (between 1967 and 1976), founded by and named after Friedel Münch
 Munch (disambiguation)
 Munich
 

German-language surnames